The 2015 IIHF World Championship was the 79th event hosted by the International Ice Hockey Federation (IIHF), held from 1–17 May 2015 in Prague and Ostrava, Czech Republic. It broke the historical attendance record of IIHF World Championships.

Canada won their 25th title by defeating Russia 6–1 in the championship final game. Canada went undefeated at the tournament to win its first IIHF championship since 2007. With the win, Canadian captain Sidney Crosby became a member of the Triple Gold Club and the first to be the team captain for all three events. For winning all of its tournament games in regulation, the Canadian team earned the new Infront Team Jackpot award of one million Swiss francs. The Russians on the other hand were fined 80,000 CHF for most Russian players walking out from the medal ceremony before the Canadian anthem was played after the final game.

The United States won the bronze medal, defeating Czech Republic 3–0 in the bronze medal final game. Czech player Jaromír Jágr (at 43 years of age) was the MVP of the tournament, and announced his retirement from international competition afterwards.

Bids
On 21 May 2010, the Czech bid was successful and got 84 votes in the race for hosting the 2015 IIHF World Championship. The application beat out that from Kyiv, Ukraine (22 votes).

The two venues for the tournament were the O2 Arena (formerly Sazka Arena) in Prague and ČEZ Aréna in Ostrava, the same two venues that co-hosted the 2004 IIHF World Championship. Before Ostrava was announced, Plzeň, Brno, Pardubice, and even Bratislava, Slovakia, were considered.

Venues

Mascots: Bob and Bobek

Participants

Format
Of the 16 teams in the tournament Czech Republic qualified as host while Austria and Slovenia qualified through the 2014 IIHF World Championship Division I, the rest qualified after a top 14 placement at the 2014 IIHF World Championship. The teams were divided into two groups of which the four best from each advanced to the quarterfinals. Here they met cross-over as indicated in the section below.

In the group round, points are awarded as follows:
3 points for a win in regulation time (W)
2 point for a team that drew in regulation time but won the following overtime (OTW) or game winning shots (GWS) 
1 point for a team that drew and lost the above-mentioned competition (OTL)
0 points for a team that lost in regulation time (L)
If two or more teams finished with an equal number of points in the same group, their standings were determined by the following tiebreaking formula:
Points in games between the tied teams
Goal difference in games between the tied teams
Goals scored in games between the tied teams
Results against the closest best-ranking team outside the original group of tied teams
Results against the next highest ranking team outside the original group of tied teams
Tournament seedings

Final ranking: places 1–4 are determined by the medal games. Other places are determined by playoff positioning, group play positioning in the group, number of points, goal difference, goals scored, and tournament seeding. The two lowest ranking teams overall are relegated to Division I A.

Seeding
The seeding in the preliminary round was based on the 2014 IIHF World Ranking, which ended at the conclusion of the 2014 IIHF World Championship. Slovakia and Switzerland swapped their slots between their groups to optimize the seeding for the Czech organizers.

Group A (Prague)
 (1)
 (4)
 (5)
 (7)
 (9)
 (12)
 (13)
 (16)

Group B (Ostrava) 
 (2)
 (3)
 (6)
 (8)
 (10)
 (11)
 (14)
 (15)

Rosters

Each team's roster consisted of at least 15 skaters (forwards and defencemen) and two goaltenders, and at most 22 skaters and three goaltenders. All 16 participating nations, through the confirmation of their respective national associations, had to submit a roster by the first IIHF directorate meeting.

Officials
The IIHF selected 16 referees and 16 linesmen to work the tournament.

Preliminary round
The schedule was released on 21 August 2014.

All times are local (UTC+2).

Group A

Group B

Playoff round

Quarterfinals

Semifinals

Bronze medal game

Gold medal game

Ranking and statistics

Tournament Awards
Best players selected by the directorate:
Best Goaltender:       Pekka Rinne
Best Defenceman:       Brent Burns
Best Forward:          Jason Spezza
Most Valuable Player:  Jaromír Jágr
Source: IIHF.com
Media All-Star Team:
Goaltender:  Connor Hellebuyck
Defence:  Brent Burns,  Oliver Ekman-Larsson
Forwards:  Taylor Hall,  Jaromír Jágr,  Jason Spezza
Source: IIHF.com

Final ranking
The official IIHF final ranking of the tournament:

Scoring leaders
List shows the top skaters sorted by points, then goals.

GP = Games played; G = Goals; A = Assists; Pts = Points; +/− = Plus/minus; PIM = Penalties in minutes; POS = Position
Source: IIHF.com

Leading goaltenders
Only the top five goaltenders, based on save percentage, who have played at least 40% of their team's minutes, are included in this list.

TOI = Time on Ice (minutes:seconds); SA = Shots against; GA = Goals against; GAA = Goals against average; Sv% = Save percentage; SO = Shutouts
Source: IIHF.com

Notes

References

External links
Official website

 
2015
1
IIHF World Championship
2015 IIHF World Championship
IIHF World Championship
2015 IIHF World Championship
2015 IIHF World Championship
IIHF World Championship
IIHF World Championship